Roggenwolf (German for 'rye wolf') may refer to
 Roggenwolf (company), an Australia-based camouflage company
 Roggenwolf (mythology), a wolf-like creature in German folklore; figuratively also the last cart load of rye during harvest